Five ships of the Royal Navy have borne the name HMS Childers:

  was a 14-gun brig-sloop launched in 1778 and broken up in 1811.
  was an 18-gun  brig-sloop launched in 1812 and broken up in 1822.
  was a 16-gun Cruizer-class brig-sloop launched in 1827 and sold in 1865.
  was a torpedo boat launched in 1883, assigned to the colonial naval forces in Australia, and sold in 1918.
  was a  destroyer launched in 1945 and scrapped in 1963.

See also

References
 

Royal Navy ship names